Clines is a surname. Notable people with the surname include:

Gene Clines (1946–2022), American baseball player and coach
Hoyt Franklin Clines (1956–1994), American murderer
Peter Clines (born 1969), American author and novelist
Thomas G. Clines (1928–2013), American spy

See also
Cline (disambiguation)